The Roman Catholic Diocese of Campeche (erected 24 March 1895) is a suffragan diocese of the Archdiocese of Yucatán.

Bishops

Ordinaries
Francisco Plancarte y Navarrette (1895 - 1898), appointed Bishop of Cuernavaca, Morelos
Rómulo Betancourt y Torres (1900 - 1901) 
Francisco de Paula Mendoza y Herrera (1904 - 1909), appointed Archbishop of Durango
Jaime de Anasagasti y Llamas (1909 - 1910) 
Vicente Castellanos y Núñez (1912 - 1921), appointed Bishop of Tulancingo, Hidalgo
Francisco María González y Arias (1922 - 1931), appointed Bishop of Cuernavaca, Morelos
Luis Guízar y Barragán (1931 - 1938), appointed Coadjutor Bishop of Saltillo, Coahuila
Alberto Mendoza y Bedolla (1939 - 1967) 
José de Jesús Garcia Ayala (1967 - 1982)
Héctor González Martínez (1982 - 1988), appointed Coadjutor Archbishop of Antequera, Oaxaca 
Carlos Suárez Cázares (1988 - 1994), appointed Bishop of Zamora, Michoacán
José Luis Amezcua Melgoza (1995 - 2005), appointed Bishop of Colima
Ramón Castro Castro (2006 - 2013), appointed Bishop of Cuernavaca, Morelos
José Francisco González González (2013 - )

Auxiliary bishop
José de Jesús Garcia Ayala (1963-1967), appointed Bishop here

Episcopal See
Campeche, Campeche

References

Campeche
Campeche, Roman Catholic Diocese of
Campeche
Campeche
1895 establishments in Mexico